Macrouroidinae is a subfamily of rattails from the family Macrouridae, it contains only two species in two genera found in most tropical and temperate ocean. These species lives in deep-water. These fishes have a huge and rounded head with the consistency of a water-filled balloon. The eyes are tiny. The chin barbel is absent.

References

Gadiformes
Macrouridae